Paseban is administrative village (kelurahan in Indonesian) at Senen subdistrict, Central Jakarta. The border of Paseban are : 
 Kramat administrative village in the north
 Kenari administrative village in the west
 Johar Baru administrative village in the east
 Rawasari administrative village in the south

The zip code of this administrative village is 10440.

Toponym
The name Paseban derived from Javanese paséban, which the meaning is king's hearing place. Most likely this is indeed ancient rest house where the king of Mataram hearings when surrounded or Batavia Sunda Kelapa.

Administrative villages in Jakarta